"I Need Somebody" is a pop–dance song by the Australian pop group Bardot and was the second single released from their second album Play It Like That (2001). It was produced by the British producer Ray Hedges.

Band member Tiffani Wood said in an interview, "When we heard the demo, we hated it and didn't want to do it...But once we heard our vocals on it, they made the song. It's not what people would have expected after "ASAP"; people thought we were going with the flow of what's around, the R&B sound. "I Need Somebody" is pretty Kylie."

"I Need Somebody" became Bardot's most successful single in Australia after their first, "Poison", debuting at number 8 on the ARIA Charts (their second biggest debut) and eventually peaking at number 5. The single also peaked at number one on the ARIA Dance Chart, appealing to a wider dance audience with its various club mixes, and Bardot performed shows at nightclubs across the country. The success of the single confirmed the group's staying power and helped boost its credibility, earning more respect from critics. "I Need Somebody" was the 59th highest selling single in Australia for 2001 and the fourth highest by an Australian artist that year.

The music video shows the group in an expensive mansion, each member alone in a different part of the house. In the second half of the song, the group combines, arriving at a pool party with a DJ and guests dancing around the girls.

Track listing
Australian/ New Zealand track listing (0927418422)
 "I Need Somebody" – 3:25
 "I Need Somebody" (Superfly Club Mix) – 6:23 
 "I Need Somebody" (Le Marquis Dub Remix) – 7:00
 "I Need Somebody" (Le Marquis Remix) – 7:00
 "ASAP" (KCB Klubbmix) – 3:36

Charts

Weekly charts

Year-end charts

Certifications

References

2001 singles
Songs written by Ray Hedges
Song recordings produced by Ray Hedges
Bardot (Australian band) songs
2001 songs